John Ferguson (born 12 May 1931) is a former Australian rules footballer who played with Melbourne and South Melbourne in the Victorian Football League (VFL).

Notes

External links 		

		
		
		

1931 births
Living people
Australian rules footballers from Victoria (Australia)		
Melbourne Football Club players		
Sydney Swans players